Paul Englishby is a film and theatre composer, orchestrator, conductor and pianist. He is best known for his Emmy Award-winning jazz score for David Hare's Page Eight, his orchestral score for the Oscar nominated An Education, his BAFTA nominated score for the BBC's Luther and his many theatre scores for the Royal Shakespeare Company, with whom Paul is an associated artist.

Short Biography
Englishby was born in Preston, Lancashire in 1970. He was musically active by his teenage years, performing as a pianist in big bands and jazz ensembles as well as writing and composing his own works. He studied at Goldsmiths' College and at the Royal Academy of Music, where he received the Charles Lucas Prize for Composition and the Arthur Hervey Scholarship, as well as receiving a BBC Sound on Film Commission.
The Last Clarinet for orchestra and narrator was Englishby's first published work, and continues to be performed internationally. His other works include Short Symphony (1997), String Quartet (1995) and Blackpool Lights for Orchestra (1993). Aside from these Englishby composed pieces for his own group, The Paul Englishby Big Band, which has performed at Ronnie Scott's Jazz Club.

Scores and Compositions
In recent years, Englishby has written the original scores for a number of films and television programmes. In 2012 he won the Emmy Award for Best Original Main Title Theme Music for Page Eight, starring Bill Nighy and Rachel Weisz. He also received an Ivor Novello nomination.

Englishby is a prolific composer for the BBC, scoring all five series of the critically acclaimed drama Luther, starring Idris Elba, for which he received a BAFTA nomination. He has also scored two series of the hit series The Musketeers.

He won the ASCAP Award in 2009 for his film score to Miss Pettigrew Lives for a Day, directed by Bharat Nalluri. He also wrote the score for Lone Scherfig's Oscar nominated feature An Education, starring Carey Mulligan, and A Royal Night Out, starring Rupert Everett and Bel Powley. He was also music director and composer for the 2013 film Sunshine On Leith, featuring songs by The Proclaimers, and directed by Dexter Fletcher.
Englishby has collaborated with world-class film directors, including Debbie Isitt on critically acclaimed Brit-flick Confetti, and on the film Ten Minutes Older featuring works from directors Spike Lee, Werner Herzog, Bernardo Bertolucci, Mike Figgis and Jean-Luc Godard.

As well as commissions for film and TV, he has composed classical works for various ensembles. His credits include The Last Clarinet for solo clarinet, orchestra and narrator in 1995, Byron for large orchestra and Weep No More for string orchestra.
Englishby also recently completed a large public arts commission entitled Fireworks, several pieces for choir, orchestra, chamber group and school children, in commemoration of the Combe Down Stone Mines Project in Bath.

Theatre/Dance
Englishby has worked on over twenty productions for the Royal Shakespeare Company. Recent credits include Gregory Doran's The Hollow Crown, starring David Tennant as Richard II, and Anthony Sher as Falstaff in Henry IV. Other credits for the RSC include Death Of A Salesman (starring Anthony Sher and Harriet Walter), Twelfth Night (starring Richard Wilson), Hamlet (starring David Tennant), The Merry Wives of Windsor (starring Judi Dench), Love's Labour's Lost and A Midsummer Night's Dream.

In 2013, Englishby scored Peter Morgan's The Audience, starring Helen Mirren as Queen Elizabeth II. The Audience, with Mirren, transferred to Broadway in 2015, with Kristin Scott Thomas taking up the role in the West End. In 2014, Englishby wrote the music for David Hare's Skylight,  starring Bill Nighy and Carey Mulligan, which also transferred to Broadway from the West End in 2015.

Other notable credits include Red Velvet, starring Adrian Lester, which played at the Garrick Theatre in early 2016, Hedda Gabler, starring Sheridan Smith at the Old Vic, and Emil And The Detectives at the National Theatre.

Musical credits
As orchestrator, conductor and pianist, Englishby has worked with The London Orchestra, Britten Sinfonia, London Musici, Tallis Chamber Choir, Fibonacci Sequence and BBC Concert Orchestra to name a few. He has conducted on studio sessions and film scores both in the UK and abroad, as well as on recordings and broadcasts for radio and television. Credits include Richard Eyre's The Other Man and Michael Radford's Flawless in 2008. He worked on the Universal movie Your Highness, starring Natalie Portman and James Franco, released in 2011. Englishby orchestrated and conducted Tony Banks's classical album Six: Pieces for Orchestra, released in 2012.

Credits

Scores
2020

. 
 The Yellow Dress  
THE VISIT (National Theatre)
Royal Hunt of The Sun (Parco Theatre TOKYO)
Conversations at a Dinner Table 
2019

•   Queens of Mystery

• LUTHER s5

• THE INHERITANCE (West End/Broadway) TONY NOMINATION

• PETER GYNT (National Theatre)

•Measure for Measure

2018
 Le Canard (The Duck) (Short Film)
WHITE TEETH
IMPERIUM 

2017
PINOCCHIO (National Ballet of Canada)
DECLINE AND FALL
THE WITNESS FFOR THE PROSECUTION - Ivor Novello Award Nominee
2015/16
 The Musketeers
 Luther
 Undeniable
 Salting The Battlefield
 Turks and Caicos
2013/14
 Sunshine On Leith
 The Great Train Robbery
 The Guilty
2012
 A Mother's Son (TV)
 Good Cop (TV)
 Inside Men (TV)
 Page Eight
 Luther (TV)
2011
 Outcasts (TV)
2009
 Hamlet (TV)
 An Englishman In New York (TV)
 An Education
2008
 Miss Pettigrew Lives For A Day
2007
 Magicians
 Behind the Tricks: Making "Magicians" (TV)
2006
 Death of the Revolution
 Confetti
2002
 Ten Minutes Older: The Cello
 Ten Minutes Older: The Trumpet
 The History of Football: The Beautiful GameA Royal Night Out
2014

Orchestrator
2012
 Tony Banks: Six: Pieces for Orchestra
2010
 Your Highness
2008
 Miss Pettigrew Lives For A Day
 The Other Man
2007
 Becoming Jane
2004
 Deux Frères (aka Two Brothers)
 Love's Brother

Musical Director/Conductor
2013
 Sunshine On Leith
2012
 Tony Banks: Six: Pieces for Orchestra
2010
 The Wolfman
2009
 Skellig
 Zomerhitte (aka Summer Heat)
2008
 Miss Pettigrew Lives For A Day
 The Secret of Moonacre
 French Film
2007
 Becoming Jane
 Freakdog
 Flawless
 Miguel y William
2006
 Alpha Male
2005
 Proof
 Animal
2004
 Love's Brother
 If Only
2001
 Captain Corelli's Mandolin

Other Musical Credits
2006
 Niagara Motel (Arranger)
2002
 About A Boy (On-set music advisor)
 Hart’s War (Arranger – "Der Fuehrer’s Face")
2001
 Birthday Girl (Arranger – "The Most Beautiful Girl in the World")

Theatre Credits
2016
 Red Velvet
2015
 The Moderate Soprano
 Death Of A Salesman - RSC
2014
 Skylight
2013
 Richard II - RSC
 The Audience - The Gielgud Theatre
 Emil and The Detectives - The National Theatre
2012
 Children's Children - The Almeida
 Hedda Gabler - The Old Vic
 South Downs - Chichester Festival Theatre
2008
 The Thief of Baghdad – Royal Opera House
 Hamlet – RSC
 Love’s Labours Lost – RSC
 A Midsummer Night’s Dream – RSC
 Wuthering Heights – Birmingham Repertory
 Marianne Dreams – Almeida
 The Merchant Of Venice – RSC
 The Taming of the Shrew – RSC
2007
 Coriolanus – RSC
 Merry Wives The Musical – RSC
 Much Ado About Nothing – RSC
 The Giant - Hampstead
2006
 Twelfth Night – RSC
 Sejanus – RSC
 Sugar Mummies – Royal Court Theatre
 Yellowman – Liverpool Everyman
 Fabulation – Tricycle Theatre
2005
 Longitude – Greenwich Theatre
2004
 All's Well That Ends Well – RSC
 Anna In The Tropics - Hampstead
2003
 Blood – Royal Court Theatre
2002
 Romeo and Juliet – Festival Theatre, Chichester
 Bedroom Farce – West End
2001
 Three Sisters – Festival Theatre, Chichester

Notes

External links
 Paul Englishby: Official Website
 HotHouse Music
 

Living people
Year of birth missing (living people)